The Superleague Formula round UK is a round of the Superleague Formula. Donington Park hosted events in 2008 and 2009. In 2010 Brands Hatch and the Silverstone Circuit will both host events.

Winners

References

External links
 Superleague Formula Official Website
 V12 Racing: Independent Superleague Formula Fansite Magazine

UK